The 1954 Formula One season was the eighth season of FIA Formula One motor racing. It featured the 1954 World Championship of Drivers, and several non-championship races. The World Championship of Drivers was contested over a nine-race series which commenced on 17 January and ended on 24 October 1954. The championship was won by Juan Manuel Fangio, who drove, and won races for both Maserati and Mercedes-Benz throughout the series. Argentine drivers gained the first two positions in the championship, with José Froilán González placing second to his compatriot Fangio.

Championship summary

With Formula One changing to 2.5 litre unsupercharged engines for 1954, Mercedes re-entered Grand Prix racing for the first time since the Second World War at the French Grand Prix with the Mercedes-Benz W196, a streamlined single seater which Fangio and Karl Kling took to a 1–2 win. Fangio's French success had come after switching from the Maserati team, with whom he had won the first two Grands Prix of the season. Although the streamlined, closed-wheel body proved unsuitable for Silverstone, Mercedes produced a more conventional open-wheel body for the Nürburgring race; Fangio won three of the remaining four races.

Reigning champion Alberto Ascari had a less successful switch of teams, choosing to leave Ferrari for the newly formed Lancia team. Lancia's car, the D50, was not ready until the final World Championship race, meaning he had to sit out most of his title defence.

Championship points were awarded for the first five places in each race on an 8-6-4-3-2 basis, with 1 point awarded for the fastest lap. Only the best five of nine scores counted towards the championship. Points for shared drives were divided equally between the drivers, regardless of who had driven more laps unless one of the drivers was deemed to have completed "insufficient distance". Drivers who shared more than one car during a race received points only for their highest finish.

Argentine Onofre Marimón was killed during practice for the German Grand Prix driving a Maserati 250F. It was the first fatality at a championship Formula One race weekend.

Season review
The following races counted towards the 1954 World Championship of Drivers.

All championship races were open to cars complying with FIA Formula One regulations except the Indianapolis 500 which was for cars complying with AAA National Championship regulations, and also counted towards the 1954 AAA Championship.

The Dutch Grand Prix was initially scheduled to be held on 6 June at Zandvoort, but there was no money for the race to be held, and it was cancelled.

The German Grand Prix was given the honorary title of being the European Grand Prix of 1954.

Teams and drivers
The following teams and drivers competed in the 1954 FIA World Championship of Drivers.

World Championship of Drivers standings

Points were awarded on an 8–6–4–3–2 basis to the top five finishers at each race, with an additional point scored for the fastest lap. Only the best five results counted towards the championship. Numbers without parentheses are championship points; numbers in parentheses are total points scored.

 Italics indicates the fastest lap (one point awarded – point shared equally between drivers sharing fastest lap)
 Bold indicates pole position
 † Position shared between multiple drivers of the same car
 ‡ Several cars were shared in this race. See the race page for details.

Non-championship races
The following is a summary of the races for Formula One cars staged during the 1954 season that did not count towards the 1954 World Championship of Drivers.

Notes and references

Formula One seasons